Ludwigia hyssopifolia, called seedbox and linear leaf water primrose, is a species of flowering plant in the genus Ludwigia, native to the New World Tropics and widely introduced to the rest of the world's tropics. A serious weed of rice paddies, a single plant can produce 250,000 seeds.

References

hyssopifolia
Plants described in 1957